The Faroese Women's Cup (Steypakappingin kvinnur) is the national women's football cup competition in the Faroe Islands. The first edition was contested in 1990.

Finals

Titles by club

The clubs in italics no longer exist or are currently inactive.

See also
Faroe Islands Cup, men's edition

References

External links
Federation website (Faroese)
Cup at women.soccerway.com

Women's national association football cups
women
Faroese Women's Cup
Recurring sporting events established in 1990